Coop's Shot Tower is a shot tower located in the heart of the Melbourne CBD, Australia. It was completed in 1889 and is 50 metres high. The historic building was saved from demolition in 1973 and was incorporated into Melbourne Central complex in 1991 underneath an 84 m-high conical glass roof.

Coop's Shot Tower is 9 storeys high, and has 327 steps to the top. The tower produced six tonnes of shot weekly up until 1961, when the demand for the lead shot dwindled, because of new firearm regulations. The tower was operated by the Coops family, who also managed Clifton Hill Shot Tower.

A museum called the Shot Tower Museum has been set up inside of the tower at the back of RM Williams and DJI (D1) stores, a tenant in the tower. The tower has been the site of fatalities in 1903 and 1922.

The site is listed on the Victorian Heritage Register.

References

External links

Coop's Shot Tower: 211 LaTrobe Street, MELBOURNE on Walking Melbourne

Shot towers
Buildings and structures in Melbourne City Centre
Museums in Melbourne
Manufacturing plants in Melbourne
Industrial buildings completed in 1888
Towers completed in 1888
1888 establishments in Australia
Heritage-listed buildings in Melbourne